Growlanser VI: Precarious World is a strategy role-playing game, for the PlayStation 2. It was developed by Career Soft and published in Japan by Atlus in 2007. It is the sixth installment in the Growlanser series and is a direct sequel to Growlanser V: Generations, which was released in 2006. Although the game has not yet been released outside Japan, an English fan translation project is currently ongoing.

References

External links
 The official website of Growlanser VI: Precarious World
 A Growlanser VI: trailer from GameTrailers.com
 Growlanser Realm (unofficial fansite)

Role-playing video games
Atlus games
Growlanser
Japan-exclusive video games
PlayStation 2 games
PlayStation 2-only games
2007 video games
Video games developed in Japan

Single-player video games
Career Soft games